Lumsden was a provincial electoral division  for the Legislative Assembly of the province of Saskatchewan, Canada. The district was one of 25 created before the 1st Saskatchewan general election in 1905. It was the riding of Premier Thomas Walter Scott.

The Lumsden constituency was renamed "Regina County" between the 1908 election and the 1912 election. Redrawn to include the area of the abolished district of North Qu'Appelle in 1934, the constituency was renamed "Qu'Appelle". Redrawn and renamed again as "Qu'Appelle-Lumsden" in 1982, the riding was abolished before the 23rd Saskatchewan general election in 1995. It is now part of the Regina Qu'Appelle Valley, Lumsden-Morse, and Last Mountain-Touchwood constituencies.

Members of the Legislative Assembly

Lumsden & Regina County (1905–1975)

Qu'Appelle (1975–1982)

Qu'Appelle-Lumsden (1982–1995)

Election results

|-

|Provincial Rights
|Frederick Clarke Tate
|align="right"|701
|align="right"|43.43%
|align="right"|–
|- bgcolor="white"
!align="left" colspan=3|Total
!align="right"|1,614
!align="right"|100.00%
!align="right"|

|-

|style="width: 130px"|Provincial Rights
|Frederick Clarke Tate
|align="right"|1,149
|align="right"|59.78%
|align="right"|+16.35

|- bgcolor="white"
!align="left" colspan=3|Total
!align="right"|1,922
!align="right"|100.00%
!align="right"|

|-

|style="width: 130px"|Conservative
|Frederick Clarke Tate
|align="right"|950
|align="right"|54.01%
|align="right"|-5.77

|- bgcolor="white"
!align="left" colspan=3|Total
!align="right"|1,759
!align="right"|100.00%
!align="right"|

|-

|Conservative
|Frederick Clarke Tate
|align="right"|2,075
|align="right"|47.88%
|align="right"|-6.13
|- bgcolor="white"
!align="left" colspan=3|Total
!align="right"|4,334
!align="right"|100.00%
!align="right"|

|-

|Independent
|John Kenneth McInnis
|align="right"|1,053
|align="right"|35.93%
|align="right"|–
|- bgcolor="white"
!align="left" colspan=3|Total
!align="right"|2,931
!align="right"|100.00%
!align="right"|

|-

|- bgcolor="white"
!align="left" colspan=3|Total
!align="right"|3,710
!align="right"|100.00%
!align="right"|

|-

|style="width: 130px"|Conservative
|James Fraser Bryant
|align="right"|2,872
|align="right"|55.27%
|align="right"|+55.27

|- bgcolor="white"
!align="left" colspan=3|Total
!align="right"|5,196
!align="right"|100.00%
!align="right"|

|-

|style="width: 130px"|Conservative
|James Fraser Bryant
|align="right"|Acclaimed
|align="right"|100.00%
|- bgcolor="white"
!align="left" colspan=3|Total
!align="right"|Acclamation
!align="right"|

|-

|Conservative
|James Fraser Bryant
|align="right"|1,716
|align="right"|33.40%
|align="right"|-

|Farmer-Labour
|Tom Johnston
|align="right"|1,070
|align="right"|20.82%
|align="right"|-
|- bgcolor="white"
!align="left" colspan=3|Total
!align="right"|5,138
!align="right"|100.00%
!align="right"|

|-

|Conservative
|Claude H.J. Burrows
|align="right"|1,923
|align="right"|27.51%
|align="right"|-5.89

|CCF
|McDirmid Rankin
|align="right"|1,847
|align="right"|26.42%
|align="right"|+5.60

|- bgcolor="white"
!align="left" colspan=3|Total
!align="right"|6,990
!align="right"|100.00%
!align="right"|

|-

|style="width: 130px"|CCF
|William Thair
|align="right"|2,966
|align="right"|48.84%
|align="right"|+22.42

|Prog. Conservative
|Arthur Pearson
|align="right"|1,220
|align="right"|20.09%
|align="right"|-7.42
|- bgcolor="white"
!align="left" colspan=3|Total
!align="right"|6,073
!align="right"|100.00%
!align="right"|

|-

|style="width: 130px"|CCF
|William Thair
|align="right"|2,876
|align="right"|42.03%
|align="right"|-6.81

|Prog. Conservative
|Arthur Pearson
|align="right"|1,003
|align="right"|14.66%
|align="right"|-5.43

|- bgcolor="white"
!align="left" colspan=3|Total
!align="right"|6,843
!align="right"|100.00%
!align="right"|

|-

|style="width: 130px"|CCF
|William Thair
|align="right"|2,642
|align="right"|43.86%
|align="right"|+1.83

|Prog. Conservative
|Alvin Hamilton
|align="right"|1,521
|align="right"|25.25%
|align="right"|+10.59

|- bgcolor="white"
!align="left" colspan=3|Total
!align="right"|6,023
!align="right"|100.00%
!align="right"|

|-

|style="width: 130px"|CCF
|Cliff Thurston
|align="right"|2,193
|align="right"|36.49%
|align="right"|-7.37

|Prog. Conservative
|Samuel Haggerty
|align="right"|454
|align="right"|7.55%
|align="right"|-17.70
|- bgcolor="white"
!align="left" colspan=3|Total
!align="right"|6,010
!align="right"|100.00%
!align="right"|

|-

|style="width: 130px"|CCF
|Cliff Thurston
|align="right"|2,194
|align="right"|34.88%
|align="right"|-1.61

|Prog. Conservative
|Robert Topping
|align="right"|991
|align="right"|15.75%
|align="right"|+8.20
|- bgcolor="white"
!align="left" colspan=3|Total
!align="right"|6,291
!align="right"|100.00%
!align="right"|

|-

|CCF
|Cliff Thurston
|align="right"|2,078
|align="right"|33.73%
|align="right"|-1.15

|Prog. Conservative
|William Tufts
|align="right"|1,614
|align="right"|26.20%
|align="right"|+10.45
|- bgcolor="white"
!align="left" colspan=3|Total
!align="right"|6,161
!align="right"|100.00%
!align="right"|

|-

|NDP
|Cliff Thurston
|align="right"|2,114
|align="right"|36.18%
|align="right"|+2.45

|Prog. Conservative
|Donald K. MacPherson
|align="right"|917
|align="right"|15.69%
|align="right"|-10.51
|- bgcolor="white"
!align="left" colspan=3|Total
!align="right"|5,843
!align="right"|100.00%
!align="right"|

|-

|NDP
|Cliff Thurston
|align="right"|2,743
|align="right"|44.34%
|align="right"|+8.16

|Prog. Conservative
|C. Robin Hahn
|align="right"|568
|align="right"|9.18%
|align="right"|-6.51
|- bgcolor="white"
!align="left" colspan=3|Total
!align="right"|6,186
!align="right"|100.00%
!align="right"|

Qu'Appelle

|-

|NDP
|Donald W. Cody
|align="right"|3,430
|align="right"|37.97%
|align="right"|-6.37

|Prog. Conservative
|F. Warren Denzin
|align="right"|1,806
|align="right"|20.00%
|align="right"|+10.82
|- bgcolor="white"
!align="left" colspan=3|Total
!align="right"|9,032
!align="right"|100.00%
!align="right"|

|-

|style="width: 130px"|Progressive Conservative
|Gary Lane
|align="right"|7,231
|align="right"|46.30%
|align="right"|+26.30

|NDP
|Greg Willows
|align="right"|6,844
|align="right"|43.83%
|align="right"|+5.86

|- bgcolor="white"
!align="left" colspan=3|Total
!align="right"|15,616
!align="right"|100.00%
!align="right"|

Qu'Appelle-Lumsden

|-

|style="width: 130px"|Progressive Conservative
|Gary Lane
|align="right"|5,643
|align="right"|65.77%
|align="right"|+19.47

|NDP
|Tom Usherwood
|align="right"|2,372
|align="right"|27.65%
|align="right"|-16.18

|- bgcolor="white"
!align="left" colspan=3|Total
!align="right"|8,580
!align="right"|100.00%
!align="right"|

|-

|style="width: 130px"|Progressive Conservative
|Gary Lane
|align="right"|4,490
|align="right"|47.55%
|align="right"|-18.22

|NDP
|Suzanne Murray
|align="right"|3,763
|align="right"|39.86%
|align="right"|+12.21

|- bgcolor="white"
!align="left" colspan=3|Total
!align="right"|9,442
!align="right"|100.00%
!align="right"|

|-

|style="width: 130px"|NDP
|Suzanne Murray
|align="right"|4,907
|align="right"|48.30%
|align="right"|+8.44

|Prog. Conservative
|Martin Kenney
|align="right"|2,426
|align="right"|23.88%
|align="right"|-23.67
|- bgcolor="white"
!align="left" colspan=3|Total
!align="right"|10,160
!align="right"|100.00%
!align="right"|

See also
Electoral district (Canada)
List of Saskatchewan provincial electoral districts
List of Saskatchewan general elections
List of political parties in Saskatchewan

References
 Saskatchewan Archives Board – Saskatchewan Election Results By Electoral Division

Former provincial electoral districts of Saskatchewan